Paradrillia taiwanensis is an extinct species of sea snail, a marine gastropod mollusk in the family Horaiclavidae.

Description

Distribution
This marine species occurs off Japan.

References

 Nomura, Sitihei, "A note on some fossil Mollusca from the Takikawa beds of the northwestern part of Hokkaido, Japan." Science reports of the Tohoku Imperial University. 2nd series, Geology 18.1 (1935): 31-A8.

External links
 Japan Paleobiology Database:  Clavatula taiwanensis 

taiwanensis
Gastropods described in 1935